Interferon production regulator is a protein that in humans is encoded by the IFNR gene.

References